Stephen Philip Allison (born January 4, 1947) is a Texas politician representing District 121 in the Texas House of Representatives.

Personal life
Allison is a graduate of Texas Christian University, he met his wife Peggy while attending the school. He also attended University of Houston Law Center. Allison and his wife Peggy have 2 children, and are both members of St. Mark’s Episcopal Church where they both have taught Sunday school. He is an attorney.

Political career
Allison has served on the Alamo Heights Independent School District Early Childhood Task Force, and on the VIA Metropolitan Transit Authority Board of Trustees for 8 years and the last 2 as Vice Chairman. Allison was elected to represent district 121 in the Texas House of Representatives on November 6, 2018 and was sworn in on January 8, 2019. In the Texas House, Allison voted for pay raises for public school teachers, librarians, counselors and school nurses. He increased funding for women's health care, providing lower-income women increases access to cancer screenings and mammograms. Allison passed a health care bill that improves access to medications for children and ensures hospitals can operate at full capacity. Allison is a strong supporter of local police and opposed the de-fund the police movement. He serves on the Public Health and Public Education committees.

Elections

2018

References

Living people
21st-century American politicians
Republican Party members of the Texas House of Representatives
Place of birth missing (living people)
Texas Christian University alumni
University of Houston Law Center alumni
1947 births